The 2008 United States presidential primaries may refer to:

2008 Democratic Party presidential primaries
2008 Republican Party presidential primaries